The Jamaica International Invitational is an annual track and field competition at the National Stadium in Kingston, Jamaica as part of the IAAF World Challenge Meetings. It was first organized in 2004.

Meet records

Men

Women

References

External links
Jamaica International Invitational
Meeting Records

Annual track and field meetings
IAAF World Challenge
Athletics competitions in Jamaica
Sport in Kingston, Jamaica
Spring (season) events in Jamaica